P.A.O. Krousonas F.C., short for Podosfairikos Athlitikos Omilos Krousona (translated Football Athletic Club of Krousonas) and also known simply as PAOK or Krousonas, is a Greek football club, based in Krousonas, Heraklion. The club was founded in 1968, and its colors are black and white. They currently compete in the Heraklion FCA Α1 Division and host their home games in the Krousonas Municipal Stadium.

History
Krousonas is a member of the Heraklion Football Clubs Association, and has been competing in local competitions until 2006, when they won the Heraklion FCA Championship and earned promotion to the (now defunct) Delta Ethniki, the fourth tier of the Greek football league system. Krousonas played for seven straight seasons in the fourth division, until 2012−13, when the competition merged with the Gamma Ethniki, the country's third football division. They played for three straight seasons in the Gamma Ethniki during 2013−16, but were relegated at the end of the 2015−16 seasons and returned to local competitions after a decade in the nationals.

Titles & honours

Regional
 Heraklion FCA Championship
Winners (1): 2005−06

References

External links

Football clubs in Heraklion
Football clubs in Crete